Reverse Marranos (RMs) are Haredim who appear to live a Haredi lifestyle but do not believe in the core beliefs associated with that lifestyle. The term highlights the opposite nature of their secrecy as compared to Spanish Jewish marranos in the Middle Ages, who were forced to publicly abandon their Judaism while secretly maintaining their Jewish customs. 

Since the advent of the Internet, RMs tend to converse and support each other online within social media groups and on web-based forums.
Because of the secrecy inherent in maintaining an RM lifestyle, the number of RMs individuals is difficult to gauge, and estimates range from several hundred to several thousand worldwide.

Many young Jewish teens are RMs as they keep their disbelief to themselves, and stay in their parents care. Often in such cases, if they "come out" as less religious or atheist, they would be kicked out of home and all ties with the teen will be cut off by the former family and rabbis.

References

External links

 Footsteps, an organization helping people going "Off The Derech" (OTD) to settle in the secular world
 "Off The Derech" Resources

Disengagement from religion
Heresy in Judaism
Jewish society
Orthodox Judaism